The Runningwater Formation is a geologic formation in Nebraska. It preserves fossils dating back to the Hemingfordian of the Early Miocene of the Neogene period. The sandstones and conglomerates of the formation were deposited in a fluvial environment. The formation has provided many fossil mammals.

Fossil content 
Among the following fossils have been found in the formation:
Mammals

 Aletomeryx gracilis
 Arretotherium fricki
 Barbouromeryx trigonocorneus
 Cynarctoides acridens
 Cynelos stenos
 Diceratherium niobrarense
 Daphoenodon (Borocyon) robustum
 Desmocyon thomsoni
 Hypertragulus minor
 Menoceras barbouri
 Merychyus arenarum, M. elegans
 Metatomarctus canavus
 Osbornodon iamonensis
 Pseudoblastomeryx advena
 Anchitheriomys stouti
 Desmatippus tyleri
 Edaphocyon lautus
 Amphicyon galushai
 Craterogale cf. simus
 Leptarctus cf. ancipidens
 Leptocyon vulpinus
 Tephrocyon scitulus
 Merycochoerus proprius

Reptiles
 Macrochelys schmidti
 Rhineura marslandensis
 Sceloporus sp.

See also 
 List of fossiliferous stratigraphic units in Nebraska
 Paleontology in Nebraska

References

Bibliography 
   

Geologic formations of Nebraska
Neogene geology of Nebraska
Miocene Series of North America
Hemingfordian
Aquitanian (stage)
Burdigalian
Sandstone formations of the United States
Conglomerate formations
Fluvial deposits
Fossiliferous stratigraphic units of North America
Paleontology in Nebraska
Formations
Formations